Nebraska Highway 78 is a highway in southern Nebraska.  It has a southern terminus at the Kansas border where it continues from K-28.  Its northern terminus is at an intersection with Nebraska Highway 4 west of Lawrence.

Route description
Nebraska Highway 78 begins at the Kansas border, as a continuation of K-128 south of Guide Rock.  The entire route of NE 78 is a straight north–south road through mostly farmland.  It heads north from the Kansas border, passing through Guide Rock.  To the north of Guide Rock, the highway intersects US 136.  It then continues northward until it reaches its termination point at NE 4 west of Lawrence.

Major intersections

References

External links

Nebraska Roads: NE 61-80

078
Transportation in Webster County, Nebraska